Meryl Poster is the president and founder of Superb Entertainment. Until October 2014, she was president of television at The Weinstein Company. Poster was previously the co-president of production for Miramax Films, where she executive produced the Academy Award-winning Chicago (2002) and Academy Award-nominated Cider House Rules (1999) and Chocolat (2000). She is an executive producer of the Bravo drama The Girlfriend's Guide to Divorce, which premiered in December 2014.

Early life and work 

Poster was one of the first female trainees at the William Morris Agency, where she began working in the mailroom in New York in 1986. In 1989 she began working for Harvey Weinstein as his assistant, thereby beginning her longtime association with the Weinstein brothers and Miramax Films.  She rose to co-president of production at Miramax Films.

Career

NBC Universal 

Poster had a producing deal at NBC Universal for five years, and served as a consultant for chairman Jeff Zucker. She signed it up from 2005 to 2010 after leaving Miramax.

The Weinstein Company 

In early 2011, Poster joined The Weinstein Company as president of television, having previously worked for Harvey and Bob Weinstein for 16 years at Miramax. While at The Weinstein Company, she oversaw all television development and production, including Project Runway and spinoffs After the Runway (2011), Project Accessory (2011), Project Runway All Stars (2012), Project Runway: Threads (2014), and Project Runway: Under the Gunn (2014). She has also developed VH1’s Mob Wives (2013) and spinoffs Big Ang (2012) and Mob Wives Chicago (2012), as well as Trailer Park: Welcome to Myrtle Manor (2013) on TLC, Rodeo Girls (2013) on A&E, Supermarket Superstar (2013) on Lifetime, Million Dollar Shoppers (2013) on Lifetime. In addition to reality television, Poster has paired with Amy Sherman-Palladino, creator and writer of Gilmore Girls, for an adaptation of The Nanny Diaries for ABC.

Poster ardently defended Harvey Weinstein when news of his decades-long pattern of violent behavior and sexual abuse came to light—engaging in public damage-control, and contacting accusers on Weinstein's behalf.

Superb Entertainment 

	In October 2014, Poster left The Weinstein Company to expand her own production company, Superb Entertainment, through a partnership with A+E Studios. Through this agreement, Poster will produce both scripted and unscripted programming.

Other professional ventures and accolades

Poster is a member of the Academy of Motion Picture Arts and Sciences, BAFTA, Women In Communications, and she serves as a vice chair on UJA-Federation's Entertainment, Media and Communications Executive Committee. She has been profiled in numerous publications, including Premiere, W, Vanity Fair, Mademoiselle, Elle, Gotham and Glamour and was ranked in The Hollywood Reporters Power 100 for five consecutive years. She is a member of the Tulane Deans' Council.

Filmography

Executive producer credits

Awards

References

 "One of the Few in Hollywood Who Can Say 'No' to Harvey Weinstein Meryl Poster By Emma Bazilian". Adweek. May 20, 2013.
 "The Formula for Success". Marie Claire. April 18, 2012.
 "Meryl Poster: Featured Panelist, Women of New York, 2012". Broadcasting & Cable. February 9, 2012. 
 "Weinstein Company Plans to Launch TV Division with Meryl Poster in Talks to Run It". Deadline. January 11, 2011
 "Meryl Poster Poised to Return Working with Weinsteins". The Wrap. January 18, 2011. 
 "Meryl Poster’s New Perch: Weinstein TV". WWD. December 30, 2011.

External links
 

Living people
Year of birth missing (living people)